Jean-François Montauriol (born 21 March 1983) in Toulouse, France is a Franco-Italian rugby union player. His preferred position is in the Back Row although he can also play equally well in the Second Row. He currently plays for Rugby Rovigo in the Top12. He began his career at his hometown club Stade Toulousain but was never a regular first-XV player. He moved to Venezia before the start of the 2008-09 season, where his performances were rewarded with a call-up to the Italy squad for the match against England in the 2009 Six Nations Championship. He came on as a replacement for the final 4 minutes of the game at Twickenham, winning his first cap. He was also selected on Italy's 2009 summer tour to Australia and New Zealand. He won his second cap against Australia in Melbourne on this tour.

References

1983 births
Italian rugby union players
Living people
Rugby union flankers
Italian people of French descent
Italy international rugby union players
Rugby Club I Medicei players
Rugby Rovigo Delta players
Stade Toulousain players
Rugby union players from Toulouse
Venezia Mestre Rugby FC players
Benetton Rugby players
French rugby union players